Khuan Hin Mui railway station is a railway station located in Na Kha Subdistrict, Lang Suan District, Chumphon.

Services 
 Ordinary No. 254/255 Lang Suan-Thon Buri-Lang Suan
 Local No. 445/446 Chumphon-Hat Yai Junction-Chumphon

References 
 
 

Railway stations in Thailand
Chumphon province